The Bridport by-election of 1875 was fought on 31 March 1875. The byelection was fought due to the death of the incumbent MP, Thomas Alexander Mitchell. It was won by the Liberal candidate Pandeli Ralli.

Results

References 

1875 in England
19th century in Dorset
1875 elections in the United Kingdom
History of Dorset
By-elections to the Parliament of the United Kingdom in Dorset constituencies